The 2020–21 Galatasaray S.K. season was the club's 117th season in existence and the club's 63rd consecutive season in the top flight of Turkish football. In addition to the domestic league, Galatasaray participated in this season's editions of the Turkish Cup and the UEFA Europa League. The season covered the period from 27 July 2020 to 30 June 2021.

Club

Board of Directors 
You can see the fields of the board members by moving the pointer to the dotted field.

Staff 
The list of the staff is below.

Facilities 

|}

Kits 
Galatasaray and Nike introduced their home and away jerseys on 27 July 2020.

Supplier: Nike
Main sponsor: Sixt

Back sponsor: Magdeburger Sigorta
Sleeve sponsor: Nesine.com

Socks sponsor: $GAL Fan Token

Transfers

Transfers in

Loans in

Transfers out

Loans out

Total spending: €0.412M 

Total income: €3.913M  

Expenditure: €4.325M

First team squad 

|-
|colspan=12 align=center|Players sold or loaned out after the start of the season

Statistics

Appearances

Goals
Includes all competitive matches.

Hat-tricks

(H) – Home ; (A) – Away

Assists
Includes all competitive matches.

Clean sheets

Disciplinary record

Injury record

Pre-season, mid-season and friendlies

Competitions

Overview

Süper Lig

League table

Results summary

Results by round

Matches

Turkish Cup

UEFA Europa League

Overall

References

External links

Galatasaray S.K. (football) seasons
Galatasaray
Galatasaray
2020 in Istanbul
2021 in Istanbul
Galatasaray Sports Club 2020–21 season